Bimbo is slang for a conventionally attractive, sexualized, naive, and unintelligent woman.  The term was originally used in the United States as early as 1919 for an unintelligent or brutish man.

As of the early 21st century, the "stereotypical bimbo" appearance became that of an attractive woman. It is often used to describe women who are blonde, have curvaceous figures, heavy makeup, and revealing clothing. It is commonly associated with "the dumb blonde" stereotype.

History

The word bimbo derives from the Italian bimbo, a masculine-gender term that means "(male) baby" or "young (male) child" (the feminine form of the Italian word is bimba). Use of this term began in the United States as early as 1919, and was a slang word used to describe an unintelligent or brutish man.

It was not until the 1920s that the term bimbo first began to be associated with women in popular culture. In 1920, Frank Crumit, Billy Jones, and Aileen Stanley all recorded versions of "My Little Bimbo Down on the Bamboo Isle", with words by Grant Clarke and music by Walter Donaldson. The song uses the term "bimbo" to describe an island girl of questionable virtue. The 1929 silent film Desert Nights uses it to describe a wealthy female crook, and in The Broadway Melody, an angry Bessie Love calls a chorus girl a bimbo. The first use of its female meaning cited in the Oxford English Dictionary is dated 1929, from the scholarly journal American Speech, where the definition was given simply as "a woman".

In the 1940s, bimbo was still being used to refer to both men and women, as in, for example the comic novel Full Moon by P. G. Wodehouse who wrote of "bimbos who went about the place making passes at innocent girls after discarding their wives like old tubes of toothpaste".

The term died out again for much of the 20th century until it became popular again in the 1980s and 1990s, with political sex scandals. As bimbo began to be used increasingly for females, exclusively male variations of the word began to surface, like mimbo and himbo, a backformation of bimbo, which refers to an unintelligent, but attractive, man.

In 2017, "The Bimbo Movement" was founded by self-proclaimed bimbo and adult star Alicia Amira, "the woman most responsible for popularizing the idea of reclaiming hyper-femininity"<ref name="Mel Magazine">[https://melmagazine.com/en-us/story/the-queen-of-the-bimbos-isnt-nearly-as-dumb-as-you-probably-think Mel Magazine’]</ref> in order to destigmatise women who are bimbos and to reclaim the term "bimbo". The Bimbo Movement is a movement to empower women to be proud to embrace their femininity, take ownership of their sexuality, and by reclaiming the word "bimbo", fight back against the misogynistic connotations the term “bimbo” had been associated with. The bimbo movement is an internationally recognized women's rights movement consisting of hundreds of thousands of self-proclaimed bimbos working to end stigma.

By the early 2020s, the term re-entered usage by way of some members of Generation Z seeking to further reclaim the pejorative, such as the "BimboTok" community on the social media platform TikTok, where users engaged in stereotypical hyper-femininity to satirise consumerism, capitalism, and misogyny. TikTokers such as Chrissy Chlapecka and Griffin Maxwell Brooks have been noted as key figures in the BimboTok community.

The term is sometimes associated with men or women who dye their hair blond, indicating that physical attractiveness is more important to them than other, non-physical traits and as an extension to "the dumb blonde" stereotype.

Usage in popular culture

Films
In 1930, in an episode from the Dogville Comedies series of short films, entitled The Dogway Melody, one of the dogs portraying a sultan in a play, remarks on the "boatload of bimbos" he has for his harem
Also in 1930, the Max Fleischer cartoon character of Bimbo the dog was introduced, with his clumsy, unlucky nature loosely representing the word's early definition of an unintelligent man. The character of Betty Boop was initially created as Bimbo's love interest
In the 2002 film Two Weeks Notice, Lauren Wade (Francie Swift) accused Lucy Kelson (Sandra Bullock) saying: "You're just another one of his stupid bimbos!" referring to her husband George Wade (Hugh Grant)

Television
In the Seinfeld episode "The Stall", Elaine's boyfriend is a male bimbo or "mimbo"How I Met Your Mother generally uses this term to describe all the women who slept with Barney Stinson
On the television show Charlie’s Angels in the  classic 1976 episode Angels in Chains, the undercover detectives are referred to as “bimbos” by a crooked law enforcement officer
In Funimation's English dub of the Adachi and Shimamura episode "Playing Ping-Pong in Our Uniforms", Shimamura introduces Nagafuji, her classmate, to the audience as "an aloof bimbo, with huge aloof bimboobs"

Music
In 1953, Jim Reeves recorded the song "Bimbo"
In 1974, Bimbo Jet released their hit "El Bimbo"
In 1997, the Danish band Aqua used the word bimbo in their major hit "Barbie Girl," using the dumb blonde archetype as well ("I'm a blonde bimbo girl."). It was noted by Mattel in the legal conflict against Aqua and their record company for the representation of the popular Barbie doll
In 2001, the Swedish pop rock band Lambretta released a song called "Bimbo"
In 2012, Bridgit Mendler used the word bimbo in the song "Forgot to Laugh"
In 2012, Every Time I Die released a song called "Underwater Bimbos from Outer Space"
In "Bimbo", a song by Marwa Loud and Moha K
 In March of 2021, Tila Tsoli released “Bimbo Doll” feat. BJ Lips

Internet
A beauty contest game called Miss Bimbo is an online game in which players attempt to use virtual characters to win contests, earn IQ points and impress virtual boys, through makeovers, clothing, exercise, and the purchase of operations such as facelifts and breast implants. Although the game itself does not promote such activities in real life and is often viewed as a parody, it has received condemnation in the media from parent groups, especially in Europe

Politics

In American politics, the word was used in the 1990s during Bill Clinton's sexual misconduct allegations, leading to the invention of the term "Bimbo eruptions" to refer to political sex scandals. The expression was also used in a 2014 report in which Colin Powell explained his reluctance to vote for Hillary Clinton in light of her husband's continued affairs with "bimbos"

After the first 2015 Republican Presidential Debate, Donald Trump re-tweeted a message calling debate moderator and Fox News host Megyn Kelly a "bimbo" via Twitter.
This took place after Kelly asked Trump a question that referenced his television show The Apprentice from season 6 in 2005.  Shortly afterwards, Stephen Richter of The Globalist published an opinion piece in which he accused Trump of being a bimbo, noting the original definition of bimbo as "an unintelligent or brutish male"

 Quotations 

 A bimbo is a woman who is not pretty enough to be a model, not smart enough to be an actress, and not nice enough to be a poisonous snake. —P. J. O'Rourke
 Referencing the Barbie Doll: she is the first doll to prove that you can be sexual and beautiful but not a bimbo. 
 1960, P. G. Wodehouse, Jeeves in the Offing, chapter III:

 1960, P. G. Wodehouse, Jeeves in the Offing, chapter XIII:

See also
It girl
Stereotypes of blondes
Sex and intelligence
Himbo

Regional
Valleyspeak
Ah Lian
Valley girl and Essex girl carry similar connotations to a young bimbo or "bimbette", but are non-synonymous.
Kogal or, more correctly, kogyaru and ganguro carry similar connotations as a Japanese version of a "valley girl" or bimbo.
Barbie is the equivalent word for Bimbo in many Hispanic countries.
"Loosu ponnu", meaning "Crazy girl", is a stereotype in Tamil cinema that is regarded as the equivalent of the dumb blond archetype
In German, Bimbo'' is exclusively a racist slur for people with dark skin.

References

Pejorative terms for women
Slang terms for women
Stereotypes of women
Female stock characters